José Miguel Prieto Castillo (born 22 November 1971) is a Spanish retired footballer who played as a central defender.

Nicknamed Shark due to his fierce character, he appeared in 282 competitive games for Sevilla in a 14-year professional career.

Club career
Born in Albacete, Castile-La Mancha, Prieto began playing as a senior with local Albacete Balompié, in Segunda División B. In the summer of 1989 the 17-year-old signed with Sevilla FC, being assigned to the B-team who competed in the same level.

Prieto made his La Liga debut on 21 January 1990, playing the full 90 minutes in a 2–1 away win against CD Tenerife. He appeared in just 13 first-team matches in his first two full seasons combined, however.

Prieto scored his first top level goal on 9 April 1994, netting the game's only at Sporting de Gijón. From 1996 to 2001 he experienced two promotions and as many relegations with his main club, partnering mainly Juan Martagón in the center of the defense. 

Prieto retired in June 2003 at the age of 31, after several knee problems.

International career
Prieto earned 32 caps for Spain at youth level, including 14 for the under-21 team. He was sent off on his debut on 14 January 1992, in a 0–0 friendly draw in Portugal.

Honours

Club
Sevilla
Segunda División: 2000–01

International
Spain U21
UEFA European Under-21 Championship third place: 1994

References

External links

1971 births
Living people
Sportspeople from Albacete
Spanish footballers
Footballers from Castilla–La Mancha
Association football defenders
La Liga players
Segunda División players
Segunda División B players
Albacete Balompié players
Sevilla Atlético players
Sevilla FC players
Spain youth international footballers
Spain under-21 international footballers